Roland Varga (born 22 October 1977) is a Hungarian–Croatian discus thrower, Olympic participant.

His personal best throw is 67.38 metres, achieved in June 2002 in Veszprém.

In 2007 Varga was found guilty of boldenone doping. The sample was delivered on 22 July 2006 in an in-competition test in Debrecen. He received an IAAF suspension from September 2006 to September 2008, as well as disqualification of all results accomplished since the day he was tested. The disqualification includes his eleventh place at the 2006 European Championships in August 2006.

Since 2009 Varga competes for Croatia and in 2010 he set a new National Record with 67.20 m.

Achievements

See also
List of sportspeople sanctioned for doping offences

References

External links

1977 births
Living people
Croatian male discus throwers
Hungarian male discus throwers
Doping cases in athletics
Hungarian sportspeople in doping cases
Athletes (track and field) at the 2012 Summer Olympics
Olympic athletes of Croatia
World Athletics Championships athletes for Croatia
Competitors at the 2001 Summer Universiade
Competitors at the 2003 Summer Universiade
Competitors at the 2005 Summer Universiade
Croatian people of Hungarian descent